"I'll Fly for You" is a song by English new wave band Spandau Ballet, released as the second single from their fourth studio album, Parade (1984). It became the band's ninth top-10 entry in their native United Kingdom, reaching number 9 on the UK Singles Chart. It also performed well in several other countries. Critics were divided, with some finding fault with the lyrics and others calling it their best single in quite some time. The music video was shot in and around New Orleans and incorporated a Mardi Gras parade into its storyline.

Release and commercial performance
Recorded in spring 1984, "I'll Fly for You" was released in the UK in August of that year and peaked at number 9 there. It also reached number 6 in Italy, number 10 in Ireland, number 28 in the Netherlands, number 35 in New Zealand and number 38 in Australia.

Critical reception
The song received mixed reviews upon its release. Betty Page of Record Mirror complained, "And how's this for spectacularly uninspired lyrics: 'And when you sing to me/the shoo-bee-doo's you sing so well'." Robert Hodgens of Smash Hits qualified his praise: "Their best single in ages. A good feel, good mood and good melody—though I find the title line inappropriate and awkward. (And that goes for the sax too!)"  Rip It Ups Mark Phillips wrote, "Lush and cleverly constructed, this song is a winner."

Music video
Spandau Ballet traveled to New Orleans to shoot the video for "I'll Fly for You", on which they continued their work with "Only When You Leave" director Simon Milne. Kemp told Number One magazine, "We didn't want it to look like a travelogue and just spend lots of money for the sake of it. We had a specific idea what we wanted to do involving the conflict between a desire for freedom and escape and the slavery and rough justice of the Deep South." In the video Hadley's lover (played by local New Orleans model Peggy Geibel) escapes from police custody during a Mardi Gras parade after a jury finds her guilty of the crime she committed. The end of the video shows the lovers speeding down a highway in a convertible, and the last few moments reveal their actual destination. 

The BBC disapproved of a scene in which Geibel and Martin Kemp were "rolling naked in the mud" and wanted it removed. Clothing is visible in the footage that was included.

In his autobiography To Cut a Long Story Short, Hadley wrote, "John, Steve and I appeared in a fictitious courtroom scene—the first time we faced a judge together. Martin was there too. Only Gary was missing. Actually, for all it was made up, it was a lot more plausible than our genuine court appearance a few years later."

Track listings7-inch singleA. "I'll Fly for You" – 5:11
B1. "To Cut a Long Story Short" (live) – 5:0212-inch singleA. "I'll Fly for You" – 5:34
B1. "To Cut a Long Story Short" (live) – 5:02
B2. "I'll Fly for You" (Glide Mix) – 7:13

Personnel
Credits adapted from the liner notes for Parade, except as noted:Spandau Ballet Tony Hadley – lead vocals
 Gary Kemp – guitar and backing vocals
 Martin Kemp – bass
 Steve Norman – saxophone and percussion
 John Keeble – drumsAdditional musician Jess Bailey – keyboardsProduction'
 Tony Swain – producer, engineer
 Steve Jolley – producer
 Spandau Ballet – producers
 Richard Lengyel – engineering assistance
 Pete Hillier – equipment
 Nick Sibley – equipment
 David Band – illustration
 Mixed at Musicland Studios (Munich)

Charts

Notes

References

Bibliography

1984 songs
1984 singles
Spandau Ballet songs
Chrysalis Records singles
Song recordings produced by Jolley & Swain
Songs written by Gary Kemp